Cathedral of Coria or Catedral de Asunción de Nuestra Señora is a Roman Catholic church located in the town of Coria, Region of Extremadura, Spain.

History
The cathedral construction began in 1498 at the site of an older Visigothic cathedral and a later mosque. The cloister was built in the 14th century. In the next century, designs for the church were pursued by Martín de Solorzano and Pedro de Ybarra. The nave has Gothic tracery, while the facades and doorways show Renaissance decoration. The church suffered from the 1755 Lisbon earthquake, when its belltower fell.

References

Churches in Extremadura
Roman Catholic cathedrals in Extremadura
15th-century Roman Catholic church buildings in Spain
Renaissance architecture in Extremadura
Gothic architecture in Extremadura
Buildings and structures in the Province of Cáceres